Labaniyat Arjan Shiraz Futsal Club is an Iranian professional futsal club based in Shiraz.

Season by season
The table below chronicles the achievements of the Club in various competitions.

Last updated: July 8, 2021

Honours 
 Iran Futsal's 1st Division
 Champions (2): 2007–08, 2015–16

References 

Futsal clubs in Iran
Sport in Shiraz
2005 establishments in Iran
Futsal clubs established in 2005